WCMN can refer to:

 WCMN (AM), a radio station (1280 AM) licensed to serve Arecibo, Puerto Rico
 WCMN-FM, a radio station (107.3 FM) licensed to serve Arecibo, Puerto Rico
 WCMN-LD, a low-power television station (channel 14, virtual 13) licensed to serve St. Cloud–Sartell, Minnesota, United States
 The West China Missionary News